Ponam Island is located off the north coast of Manus Island in Papua New Guinea.

The Ponam language is spoken on the island.

The Ponam Airfield was built by the US Navy 78th Naval Construction Battalion "Seabees" between June to August 1944. As half of the work area was swamp, coral was blasted and dredged from the ocean bed and used as landfill. During the Admiralty Islands campaign, it was used as a fighter base to provide repair and overhaul facilities for carrier aircraft, as part of Manus Naval Base. The USO entertainer Bob Hope stop at Ponam Airfield in 1944 with an unscheduled show with troops from surrounding bases.

Ponam Airfield
Based at Ponam Airfield was:
78th Naval Construction Battalion 
140th Battalion
ACORN 28 - Seabee unit 
VMF-312 (24 x FG Vought F4U Corsair unit) 
VP-130 (15 Lockheed Ventura [PV-1] unit) 
VC-75 (Grumman F4F Wildcat unit) 
Carrier Aircraft Service Unit 42
Carrier Aircraft Service Unit 13
Carrier Aircraft Service 587

See also
Pityilu Island

References

Further reading 

 Carrier, James G., and Achsah H. Carrier (1989). Wage, Trade, and Exchange in Melanesia: A Manus Society in the Modern State. Berkeley:  University of California Press.

External links 
Photo of Ponam Island, Panaramio

Islands of Papua New Guinea
Manus Province